Hardoi  Assembly constituency is  one of the 403 constituencies of the Uttar Pradesh Legislative Assembly,  India. It is a part of the Hardoi district and one  of the five assembly constituencies in the Hardoi Lok Sabha constituency. First election in this assembly constituency was held in 1952 after the "DPACO (1951)" (delimitation order) was passed in 1951. After the "Delimitation of Parliamentary and Assembly Constituencies Order" was passed in 2008, the constituency was assigned identification number 156.

Wards  / Areas
Extent  of Hardoi Assembly constituency is KCs Hardoi, Bawan, Sharah Daxin &  Hardoi MB of Hardoi Tehsil.

Members of the Legislative Assembly

Election results

2022

2012
16th Vidhan Sabha

See also

Hardoi district
Hardoi Lok Sabha constituency
Sixteenth Legislative Assembly of Uttar Pradesh
Uttar Pradesh Legislative Assembly
Vidhan Bhawan

References

External links
 

Assembly constituencies of Uttar Pradesh
Hardoi